Pietro Francesco Alberti (1584–1638) was an Italian painter and engraver for the late-Renaissance and early-Baroque periods.

He was born at Sansepolcro into a family of artists, the son of painter Durante Alberti from Sansepolcro. He painted historical subjects in the style of his father, and has left works in Rome and in his birthplace. He was the engraver of a plate called Accademia de' Pittori a large print lengthways. He died in Rome.

References

1584 births
1638 deaths
People from Sansepolcro
16th-century Italian painters
Italian male painters
17th-century Italian painters
Italian Baroque painters
Italian engravers
Pietro Francesco